Aspidospermidine is an alkaloid isolated from plants in the genus Aspidosperma. It has been a popular target for total synthesis, due in part to the fact that it provides a good showcase for synthetic strategies but also because the structure is similar to many other important bioactive molecules.

References

Alkaloids found in Apocynaceae
Indolizidines